Boris Obergföll ( Henry; born 14 December 1973) is a retired German track and field athlete who competed in the javelin throw. He won a bronze medal in the World Championships twice (1995 and 2003). His personal best throw was 90.44 metres, set in July 1997. This ranks him fifth among German javelin (new implement) throwers, behind Johannes Vetter, Thomas Röhler, Raymond Hecht and Andreas Hofmann.

He also competed in the javelin throw at the 1996 Summer Olympics (fifth place) and the 2000 Summer Olympics (seventh place). He was entered into the 2004 Summer Olympics but did not start the competition and retired thereafter.

He represented SV Saar 05 Saarbrücken and was trained by Klaus Bartonietz. He is married to Christina Obergföll, whose surname he adopted upon marriage.

International competitions 

IAAF Golden League
Bislett Games: 2002
Memorial Van Damme: 2002, 2003
ISTAF: 2002

National titles
German Athletics Championships
Javelin throw: 1995, 1997, 1998, 2000, 2003, 2004

Seasonal bests
 1989 – 58.20
 1990 – 65.86
 1991 – 74.78
 1992 – 77.34
 1993 – 84.12
 1994 – 82.02
 1995 – 88.46
 1996 – 88.00
 1997 – 90.44
 1998 – 89.21
 1999 – 88.62
 2000 – 86.65
 2001 – 86.53
 2002 – 86.67
 2003 – 88.10
 2004 – 86.86
 2006 – 68.89

References

External links 
 
 

1973 births
Living people
People from Völklingen
German male javelin throwers
German national athletics champions
Olympic athletes of Germany
Athletes (track and field) at the 1996 Summer Olympics
Athletes (track and field) at the 2000 Summer Olympics
Athletes (track and field) at the 2004 Summer Olympics
World Athletics Championships athletes for Germany
World Athletics Championships medalists
European Athletics Championships medalists
Competitors at the 2001 Goodwill Games
Sportspeople from Saarland